Black salt may refer to:
Kala namak, a type of rock salt, salty and pungent-smelling condiment used in South Asia 
Black lava salt, a sea salt blended with activated charcoal